25 Años (25 Years) (1993) is the tenth studio album by Mexican rock and blues band El Tri.

The name is a reference to the duration of the career of Alex Lora who started playing in 1968 with the past incarnation of the band known as Three Souls in My Mind.

The most remarkable song of the album is the single "Pobre Soñador" a romantic hymn.

Track listing

Personnel

Musicians
 Alex Lora – guitar, arranger, vocals, producer, mixing, artistic producer
 Rafael Salgado – harmonic
 Felipe Souza – electric & rhythm guitar, mixing, backing vocals
 Eduardo Chico – guitar
 Pedro Martínez – drums, backing vocals
 Ruben Soriano – bass
 Chela DeLora – backing vocals

Technical
Michael Hoffman – coordination, art coordinator
Chuck Johnson – mixing, mixing assistant
Richard Kaplan – engineer, mixing

External links
www.eltri.com.mx
25 Años at MusicBrainz
[ 25 Años] at Allmusic

El Tri albums
1993 albums
Warner Music Group albums